The Bogue Falaya, also known as the Bogue Falaya River, is a  river in southeastern Louisiana in the United States.  It is a tributary of the Tchefuncte River, which flows to Lake Pontchartrain.  The river flows through an area of mixed pine-hardwood and bottomland hardwood forests on the Gulf Coastal Plain.

The Bogue Falaya rises in southwestern Washington Parish and flows generally south-southeastwardly through western St. Tammany Parish, past Covington, where it collects the Abita River.  It joins the Tchefuncte River about 10 miles (16 km) upstream of that river's mouth at Lake Pontchartrain.

The name is derived from the Choctaw words bogu, “river,” and falaya, "long."

A portion of the Bogue Falaya in St. Tammany Parish has been designated a "Natural and Scenic River" by the state government of Louisiana.

Variant names and spellings
According to the Geographic Names Information System, the Bogue Falaya has also been known historically as:

See also
List of Louisiana rivers

References

Rivers of Louisiana
Rivers of St. Tammany Parish, Louisiana
Bodies of water of Washington Parish, Louisiana
List of place names of Choctaw origin in the United States